Damien Denny (born 20 April 1966 in Lisburn, County Antrim) is a Northern Irish light middleweight boxer.

Born in Lisburn, but raised in Belfast, Denny stands 5 ft 9 in (175 cm).  His record is 18 wins (11 knockouts) and 4 losses.

He collaborated on the boxing-related films, About Five Minutes (1999) and The Boxer (1997). He played Eddie Carroll in the latter film, which starred Daniel Day-Lewis and Emily Watson, and was set in Denny's native Belfast.

External links

1966 births
Living people
Welterweight boxers
Male boxers from Northern Ireland
Sportspeople from Lisburn
Boxers from Belfast
Boxers at the 1986 Commonwealth Games
Commonwealth Games bronze medallists for Northern Ireland
Male film actors from Northern Ireland
Commonwealth Games medallists in boxing
Medallists at the 1986 Commonwealth Games